Limberg Gutiérrez Mariscal (born November 19, 1977 in Santa Cruz de la Sierra) is a Bolivian retired football player who played as an attacking midfielder. He was a player known for his scoring range and free-kick abilities.

Club career
His former clubs include Blooming, where he spent most of his football career, Bolívar, The Strongest, Oriente Petrolero, and Sport Boys Warnes in Bolivia, as well as Uruguayan giants Nacional de Montevideo.

International career
Gutiérrez was a member of the Bolivia national football team in Copa América 2004. He also has participated 24 times in FIFA World Cup qualifiers for 1998, 2002, and 2006, and played at the 1999 Confederations Cup. He earned a total of 54 caps and scored 4 goals for the Bolivia national team between 1997 and 2009.

Career statistics

International goals

Honours

Club
 Blooming
 Liga de Fútbol Profesional Boliviano: 1998, 1999
 Nacional
 Primera División Uruguaya: 2001
 Bolívar
 Liga de Fútbol Profesional Boliviano: 2004 (A), 2005 (AD), 2006 (C)

References

External links
 
 
 

1977 births
Living people
Sportspeople from Santa Cruz de la Sierra
Association football midfielders
Bolivian footballers
Bolivia international footballers
1999 FIFA Confederations Cup players
1997 Copa América players
1999 Copa América players
2001 Copa América players
2004 Copa América players
Footballers at the 2007 Pan American Games
Club Blooming players
Club Nacional de Football players
Club Bolívar players
Oriente Petrolero players
The Strongest players
Bolivian expatriate footballers
Expatriate footballers in Uruguay
Bolivian expatriate sportspeople in Uruguay
Pan American Games competitors for Bolivia